Jorge Lewinski (1921–2008) was a Polish–British photographer and soldier.

Born in Lwów, Poland (now Lviv, Ukraine), in 1921, Lewinski survived Russian occupation, internment, and forced labour in Siberia. After conscription into the Polish army, he served with Allied forces in South-west Asia. In 1942, he was sent to Britain to join the RAF, and afterwards settled.

In 1966, having developed a name for himself through the portraiture of artists, he became the pre-eminent photographer of artists in Britain. Subjects included Francis Bacon, LS Lowry, David Hockney, Henry Moore, Marcel Duchamp, Peter Blake, Pauline Boty, Gilbert and George, Barbara Hepworth, Barry Kay, William Pye, Bill Redgrave, Peter Lanyon, Marc Vaux, Albert Irvin, Maggi Hambling, Kenneth Martin, Sean Scully, Bridget Riley, Reg Butler, Anthony Gormley, Julian Trevelyan, Sheila Fell, Allen Jones, Richard Wilson, and more.

Lewinski was Senior Lecturer at the London College of Printing from 1968 to 1982, and he was admired as both a teacher and a writer on photography.

He was married to Mayotte Magnus, the photographer, and lived between England and France.

External links
Jorge Lewinski
Jorge Lewinski Archive at Chatsworth House
Jorge Lewinski Times obituary
Jorge Lewinski Guardian obituary
Jorge Lewinski Independent obituary
Jorge Lewinski at Sothebys
Artnet Encyclopaedia

1921 births
2008 deaths
20th-century British photographers
Photographers from Lviv
Polish military personnel of World War II
Polish emigrants to the United Kingdom
Polish photographers
Portrait photographers
Royal Air Force personnel of World War II